The 1984 Five Nations Championship was the fifty-fifth series of the rugby union Five Nations Championship. Including the previous incarnations as the Home Nations and Five Nations, this was the ninetieth series of the northern hemisphere rugby union championship. Ten matches were played between 21 January and 17 March.

Scotland won the championship outright for the first time since 1938. It was their twelfth outright championship, excluding a further seven shared titles. Their four wins gave them the Grand Slam for the first time since 1925 and the second in all, and the Triple Crown for the ninth time and the first since 1938.

It was also the second occasion, after 1978, in which two teams each with three victories faced off against each other in the final round of matches, with both capable of completing a Grand Slam with a victory.

Participants
The teams involved were:

Table

Squads

Results

References
1984 Five Nations Championship results

Six Nations Championship seasons
Five Nations
Five Nations
Five Nations
Five Nations
Five Nations
Five Nations
  
Five Nations
Five Nations
Five Nations